Balthazar Jean Philippe Marie Pierret (born 15 May 2000) is a French professional footballer who plays as a central midfielder for  club Quevilly-Rouen.

Club career
On 22 June 2022, Pierret signed a contract with Quevilly-Rouen for one year, with an option to extend for a second year.

References

External links
 

Living people
2000 births
Association football midfielders
French footballers
Championnat National players
Liga I players
OGC Nice players
US Boulogne players
FC Dinamo București players
French expatriate footballers
French expatriate sportspeople in Romania
Expatriate footballers in Romania